Big Brother 2014 is the ninth Swedish series and the seventh Norwegian series, and the third joined season between the two countries of the reality series Big Brother. It began on 31 August 2014 on the Swedish channel Kanal 9 and the Norwegian channel FEM, with the season being hosted by Adam Alsing and Pia Lykke. The Big Brother house is located in Spånga, Sweden.

Housemates

The Box
Roughly a day before the season's start, four hopeful contestants went inside The Box, situated in the House's backyard. There, two of them would become real housemates on Big Brother 2014 after the season premiere. The four contestants were (with the two in bold who became real housemates):
Anna Andersson, 23, Haninge, Sweden
Erland Slettmoen, 27, Jessheim, Norway
Sondre Hjertas, 20, Sarpsborg, Norway
Krisse-Ly "Krissy" Kuldkepp, 21, Gothenburg, Sweden
During Week 2 though, Sondre got chosen by the women to enter the House and became a housemate on Day 8. And on Day 11, Krissy got chosen as well into the House.

Ladies Week
During the second week, the women were in control choosing new housemates to enter the House. All the potential housemates appearing (with the ones in bold who became real housemates) are listed down here:
Christoffer Bedin, 25, Borås, Sweden
Sondre Hjertas, 20, Sarpsborg, Norway
Henrik Brækhus, 29, Bergen, Norway
Anton Allansson, 24, Falköping, Sweden
Morten Hake, 27, Sandefjord, Norway
Krissy-Ly "Krissy" Kuldkepp, 21, Gothenburg, Sweden
Jenny Frånlund, 25, Stockholm, Sweden
Ioana Valentina Pintea, 26, Oslo, Norway
Despite not being chosen, both Jenny Fr. and Ioana entered the House during Week 3. And at the live eviction night on Week 7, Henrik entered the House.

Housemates
On Day 1, fourteen housemates entered the house, and two more entered after midnight of Day 1. On Day 7, Thomas entered the House as a replacement for the ejected housemate Ståle. During week 2 between Day 8-12, five more housemates entered the House. On Day 16, Ioana entered the house. On Day 33 at the live eviction night, Malin entered. And on Day 47, Henrik and Johanna entered the house, making the total of housemates up to 24.

Nominations table

Notes

Sites
BigBrotherBlogg - Big Brother 2015 Ambassador

References

Big Brother (franchise) seasons
2014 Norwegian television seasons
2014 Swedish television seasons